PsycINFO is a database of abstracts of literature in the field of psychology. It is produced by the American Psychological Association and distributed on the association's APA PsycNET and through third-party vendors. It is the electronic version of the now-ceased Psychological Abstracts. In 2000, it absorbed PsycLIT which had been published on CD-ROM.

PsycINFO contains citations and summaries from the 19th century to the present of journal articles, book chapters, books, and dissertations.

Overview 
The database, which is updated weekly, contained over 3.5 million records as of October 2013. Approximately 175,000 records were added to the database in 2012.

Coverage 
More than 2,540 peer-reviewed journal titles are included in the database, and they make up 78% of the overall content. Journals are included if they are archival, scholarly, peer-reviewed, and regularly published with titles, abstracts, and keywords in English.  As of October 2013, over 1,700 journal titles were included in their entirety (i.e. "cover to cover"). Articles were selected for psychological relevance from the remaining titles.

Chapters from authored and edited books make up 11% of database, while entire authored and edited books make up 4% of the database. Books are selected if they are scholarly, professional, or research-based, English-language, published worldwide, and relevant to psychology.

Dissertations are selected from Dissertation Abstracts International (A and B), and make up 10% of database. They are selected on basis of classification in DAI in sections with psychological relevance. The database contains abstracts in dissertation records starting from 1995.

Publications from at least 50 countries are included, with journals in more than 27 languages, and non-English titles in Roman alphabets from 1978 to the present.

Record contents 
Each record contains a bibliographic citation, abstract, index terms from the Thesaurus of Psychological Index Terms, keywords, classification categories, population information, the geographical location of the research population, and cited references for journal articles, book chapters, and books, mainly from 2001 to present. Records of books include the book's table of contents.

Abstracts range from 1995 to present, and virtually 100% of records have abstracts (0.007% no abstracts). For non-dissertation documents added from 1967 to present, 99.2% contain abstracts.

The 11th Edition (print) of Thesaurus of Psychological Index Terms was released in July 2007, containing 200 new terms. There are more than 8,400 controlled terms and cross-references, with hierarchical, alphabetical, and subject arrangements. Records are indexed with the most specific term applicable, and major and minor terms assigned, with a maximum of 15 total terms, 5 major terms. The Thesaurus, no longer available in print format, is included with all PsycINFO licenses and is updated regularly.

The classification system consists of 22 major categories and 135 subcategories, and a list of codes. Each record is assigned to one or two classifications.

There were more than 57 million cited references in approximately 1.4 million entries for journal articles, books, and book chapters as of October 2013, all in APA-style format.

Historic records 
 Sources: Psychological Abstracts 1927–1966; Psychological Bulletin 1921–1926; American Journal of Psychology 1887–1966; All APA journals back to first issue of publication; Psychological Index (1894–1935); citations to English language journals only; Classic Books in Psychology of the 20th Century and the Harvard Book List, 1840–1971
All records published in Psychological Abstracts are now in PsycINFO. There are more than 335,000 historic records in PsycINFO, which differ from 1967–present records

No controlled vocabulary (descriptor) field; index field may contain descriptor terms, but they are not controlled; other indexing fields, such as Age Groups, form/Content are not present; classifications are broad only

Access and cost 
As PsycINFO has grown, so has the cost of accessing it. At one time it was free to individuals. As of February 2016 it costs at least $11.95 for 24 hours access. Institutions pay much more, but verified members of those institutions can then access PsycINFO for free. APA members get special pricing. There are also discounted access pricing packages with APA's related databases PsycNET, PsycARTICLES, PsycEXTRA, etc.

See also 
 PsycCRITIQUES
List of academic databases and search engines

References

External links 
 

Bibliographic databases and indexes
Works about psychology
American Psychological Association